Henry Lee "Gizmo" Williams (born May 31, 1962) is a former American and Canadian football kick returner and wide receiver.  After his retirement at the end of the 2000 CFL season, Williams worked as a motivational speaker.

Born into an impoverished family, Williams was raised by his brother Edgar after the death of both his parents as a child, and, after Edgar's death, by an aunt.  Despite his background, Williams was able to be a successful high school football player, and was able to enroll at East Carolina University.  After graduating from East Carolina, Williams was signed by the Memphis Showboats of the United States Football League.  While playing in Memphis, future Professional Football Hall of Famer Reggie White gave the shifty Williams the nickname "Gizmo", which would stick with him through his professional career.

Williams was released by the Showboats after one season in the USFL in 1985, and signed with the Edmonton Eskimos of the Canadian Football League.  With the exception of a half-season with the Philadelphia Eagles in 1989, Williams would play with the Eskimos for every CFL season from 1986 to 2000.

Standing a diminutive , Williams was in many ways a prototypical Canadian football kick returner. He saw some success as a receiver, breaking 900 yards receiving on two occasions, but was best known for his work as a returner. Williams soon developed a trademark of doing a flip in the air after every score, which quickly became associated with Williams in the eyes of the fans. Perhaps his most memorable was a 115-yard missed-field-goal return for a touchdown in the 1987 Grey Cup.

In 2002, Williams's #2 was put on the Edmonton Eskimos Wall of Honour.  Four years later, Williams was inducted into the Canadian Football Hall of Fame with a class that included former teammate and quarterback Matt Dunigan.  In November 2006 he was voted one of the CFL's Top 50 players (#25) of the league's modern era by Canadian sports network The Sports Network/TSN.

Williams has a family history of multiple sclerosis, which killed his mother in December 1969 when Williams was six, as well as seven of his ten siblings.  Williams's father died in a house fire at Christmas of 1970.

See also
 List of NCAA major college yearly punt and kickoff return leaders

References

External links
 MCP Talent page
 Bio on CFL.ca 

1962 births
Living people
African-American players of American football
African-American players of Canadian football
American football return specialists
American football wide receivers
Calgary Stampeders players
Canadian Football Hall of Fame inductees
Canadian football return specialists
Canadian football wide receivers
East Carolina Pirates football players
Edmonton Elks players
Memphis Showboats players
Northwest Mississippi Rangers football players
Philadelphia Eagles players
Players of American football from Memphis, Tennessee
Players of Canadian football from Memphis, Tennessee
21st-century African-American people
20th-century African-American sportspeople